Germany has submitted films for the Academy Award for Best International Feature Film since the creation of the award in 1956. The award is handed out annually by the U.S.-based Academy of Motion Picture Arts and Sciences to a feature-length motion picture produced outside the United States that contains primarily non-English dialogue.

Each year, the Academy invites countries to submit their best films for competition according to strict rules, with only one film being accepted from each country. However, because of Germany's status as a divided country throughout much of the second half of the 20th century, West Germany and East Germany competed separately in the Best Foreign Language Film category until 1990. With eight nominations and one win, West Germany was far more successful than East Germany, whose only nomination was received in 1976 for Jacob the Liar, a film which the Moscow International Film Festival had refused to screen. West Germany received four consecutive nominations during the first years of the award's existence. It fared less well in the 1960s, as all of its submissions failed to garner a nomination. The advent of New German Cinema led to an improvement of German cinema's reputation abroad. As a result of this, West Germany received several nominations during the 1970s, culminating with The Tin Drum victory in 1979.

West Germany and East Germany were formally reunited on 3 October 1990. The 63rd Academy Awards, held on 25 March 1991, were thus the first at which Germany was able to participate as a single country. Reunified Germany has been successful in the Best Foreign Language Film category, securing two wins and eight nominations in less than two decades. The two German films that received the award since reunification are The Lives of Others (2006) by Florian Henckel von Donnersmarck and Nowhere in Africa (2001) by Caroline Link. Both are the only two German directors to have had more than one film nominated for the award. Several other German films have received Academy Awards in categories other than Best Foreign Language Film.

Submissions
According to Academy rules, the selection of each country's official submission has to be made by "one organization, jury or committee that should include artists and/or craftspeople from the field of motion pictures". In Germany's case, the selection committee and procedure are organized by the Munich-based German Films Service + Marketing GmbH, known as Export-Union of German Cinema until 2004. Film producers and distributors can submit a film for consideration to German Films, which verifies the completeness of the application and the compliance with Academy rules. A committee composed of representatives of nine different German film institutions and film industry trade groups selects a film for submission to the Academy. German Films is not represented in the committee and concentrates solely on the organizational aspects. Although East Germany used to submit films sparingly, West Germany and later reunified Germany have been regular participants, and have sent a film to the Academy in every year except from 1962 to 1964 and in 1991. The refusal of the selection committee to submit a film in 1991 was highly controversial.
The selection of The White Ribbon in 2009 also caused a minor controversy.

Federal Republic of Germany
(as West Germany from 1956 to 1989, then reunified Germany from 1990 onward)

East Germany

See also
List of Academy Award winners and nominees for Best Foreign Language Film

Notes

a: Several German films were nominated for or won Academy Awards in categories other than Best Foreign Language Film. Although it was never submitted by West Germany for competition in the Best Foreign Language Film category, the submarine film Das Boot by Wolfgang Petersen was nominated for six other Academy Awards, as it had been commercially released in Los Angeles County. Nine German films were nominated in the documentary categories, but only Serengeti Shall Not Die (1959) by Bernhard Grzimek managed to win the Academy Award for Documentary Feature. The eight other nominated documentaries were: Kahl (1961) by Haro Senft, Chariots of the Gods (1970) by Harald Reinl, The Silent Revolution (1972) by Edouard de Laurot, Battle of Berlin (1973) by Franz Baake, The Yellow Star – The Persecution of the Jews in Europe 1933–45 (1980) by Dieter Hildebrandt, Marlene (1984) by Maximilian Schell, Buena Vista Social Club (1999) by Wim Wenders and The Story of the Weeping Camel (2004) by Byambasuren Davaa and Luigi Falorni.
Five non-documentary German short films won Academy Awards as well. The Academy Award for Animated Short Film was won by Christoph Lauenstein and Wolfgang Lauenstein for Balance in 1989, and by Tyron Montgomery and Thomas Stellmach for Quest in 1996. Two other German films were nominated for but did not win the Academy Award for Animated Short Film: The Periwig-Maker (2000) by Steffen Schäffler and Das Rad (2002) by Chris Stenner, Arvid Uibel and Heidi Wittlinger. The Academy Award for Live Action Short Film was won by Pepe Danquart for Black Rider (Schwarzfahrer) in 1993, by Florian Gallenberger for Quiero ser (I want to be...) in 2000 and by Jochen Alexander Freydank for Spielzeugland (Toyland) in 2008. Gregor's Greatest Invention by Johannes Kiefer was nominated for the Academy Award for Live Action Short Film in 2001 but lost.
b: The committee which selects the German submission to the Academy is composed of the following nine associations:
Verband der Filmproduzenten (Association of German Feature Film Producers);
Verband Deutscher Filmexporteure (Association of German Film Exporters);
AG Neuer Deutscher Spielfilmproduzenten (Association of New Feature Film Producers);
Verband der Filmverleiher (Association of Film Distributors);
Hauptverband Deutscher Filmtheater (Association of German Film Theaters);
Bundesverband Kamera (Association of Cinematographers);
Verband der deutschen Filmkritik (Association of German Film Critics);
Bundesverband Regie/Bundesverband der Fernseh- und Filmregisseure (Association of Television & Film Directors);
Filmförderungsanstalt (German Federal Film Board).
c: In 1991, the selection committee issued an official statement according to which no German film possessed the high quality to become a nominee. Although Agnieszka Holland's film Europa Europa was critically acclaimed (winning prizes from the New York and Boston film critics, the National Board of Review, as well as a Golden Globe) and was at the time the second highest-grossing German film ever in the United States (after Das Boot), it was not chosen. This was widely criticized and prompted several prominent German filmmakers to write an open letter denouncing the selection panel's refusal to submit Europa Europa. It was claimed that the committee did not choose the film due to its delicate subject matter (the story of a Jew who escaped persecution by the Nazis by masquerading as an Aryan). Members of the selection committee were reported to have unofficially said that the film was "junk" and "an embarrassment". It was also doubted whether the film would comply with Academy rules, as it was largely filmed in Poland and only partially produced with German financing. Although Europa Europa was not submitted, it was commercially released in Los Angeles County and thus qualified for Academy Awards in other categories. It was nominated for Best Adapted Screenplay but did not win.
d: In 2009 the selection committee chose The White Ribbon as the official German submission. This has caused some controversy as well as confusion about the rules of the Academy, which would have accepted a submission from either Germany or Austria. Martin Schweighofer, head of the Austrian Film Commission, has expressed that he isn't happy with the decision: "The discomfort arises because of the vague rules of the Academy. In essential regards the film is Austrian." It has been reported that the American distributor, Sony Pictures Classics, pressured Germany to submit it rather than Austria for tactical reasons, since Austrian films have been nominated two years in a row with 2007's The Counterfeiters and 2008's Revanche.
e: Each year is linked to an article about that particular year in film history.

References

General references 
 

German
Academy Award